Supernova is a British comedy television programme produced by Hartswood Films and jointly commissioned by the BBC in the UK and UKTV in Australia. It follows Dr Paul Hamilton (Rob Brydon), a Welsh astronomer, who leaves a dull academic post and unloved girlfriend for a new job at the Royal Australian Observatory, deep in the Australian outback. The comedy centres on his difficulties adjusting to life in the outback and his eccentric fellow astronomers. The first series was released in the United Kingdom and Australia in October 2005 and consisted of six 30-minute episodes. The second series began airing on 3 August 2006 in the UK.

The exterior scenes were shot at Broken Hill in New South Wales, Australia. The observatory itself is a CGI creation, according to the DVD commentary, and only a partial doorway was constructed on site for filming purposes.

Plot

During the series, Paul grapples with, amongst others, his attraction to his colleague Dr Rachel Mann (who is engaged to an astronaut), the arrival of his girlfriend at the observatory, and a bout of fatalism that comes on when he creates a simulation of how the universe will end.

Cast and crew

Harry Cripps – Writer
Matt Lipsey – Director
Theo Benton – Costume Designer
Rob Brydon – Dr Paul Hamilton
Hollie Andrew – Dr Jude Wardlaw
Tim Draxl – Professor Mike French
Damion Hunter – Bill
Marlene Cummins – Bill's mum
Peter Kowitz – Max Talbot
Kris McQuade – Professor Pip Cartwright
Kat Stewart – Dr Rachel Mann

Recurring
Deborah Thomson – Ruth
Morgan O'Neill – Chad

Episode list

Series 1 (2005)

The Black Holes
God, Are You Out There?
When You Wish Upon A Star
Venus Rising
Unity
Where Men Are Men

Series 2 (2006)

Wild Oats
How's Your Father?
Big Red
Perseverance
Something Wicked This Way Comes
May The Best Man Win

External links
 
 
British Sitcom Guide to Supernova
 

2005 British television series debuts
2006 British television series endings
BBC television sitcoms
Television series by Hartswood Films
Television shows set in Australia
End of the universe in fiction